Roy Franklin Scholl  (September 15, 1904 – October 8, 1993) was a professional football player who spent 1 season in the National Football League with  the Boston Bulldogs in 1929. Scholl later dismissed ever having played professionally with any team. However football historian David Neft, pointed out in 1992 that six different newspapers identify Scholl as playing one game, as a sub, for Boston in 1929. Roger Treat’s Encyclopedia of Football also has him listed as having played guard with the 1929 Bulldogs.

Scholl was employed by the Bethlehem Steel Company from approximately 1921 to 1951. He died in 1993 at age 89 at the Leigh Valley Hospital in Allentown, Pennsylvania.

Notes

1904 births
1993 deaths
Players of American football from Pennsylvania
Boston Bulldogs (NFL) players
Lehigh Mountain Hawks football players